Hsu Jui-te (born 10 October 1964) is a Taiwanese former cyclist. He competed in two events at the 1988 Summer Olympics.

References

1964 births
Living people
Taiwanese male cyclists
Olympic cyclists of Taiwan
Cyclists at the 1988 Summer Olympics
Cyclists at the 1990 Asian Games
Medalists at the 1990 Asian Games
Asian Games silver medalists for Chinese Taipei
Place of birth missing (living people)
Asian Games medalists in cycling